Edward Lee Jones (born February 23, 1951), commonly known as Ed "Too Tall" Jones due to his height, is a former American football player who played 15 seasons (1974–1978, 1980–1989) in the National Football League (NFL) for the Dallas Cowboys. In 1979, he briefly left football to attempt a career in professional boxing.

Early years

Jones was born in Jackson, Tennessee. He attended Merry High School where he played baseball and basketball. He only played three football games, because his high school did not support the sport until his senior year. His basketball skills earned him All-America honors and scholarship offers from several Division I (NCAA) programs. He also had offers from Major League Baseball teams to play first base in their farm systems.

As a senior, he fought a Golden Gloves boxing match, recording a knockout of his opponent in less than a minute. He stopped shortly after that, when his basketball coach read an article about the fight, and made him choose between basketball and boxing.

College career
He signed with Tennessee State University to play basketball, but left the team after two seasons, to concentrate on playing football under head coach John Merritt.

The  Jones received his famous nickname during his first football practice, after a teammate mentioned that his pants did not fit, because he was “too tall to play football". In his new sport, he became a two-time All-American defensive lineman, playing on a team that lost only two games, en route to winning the black college football national championship in 1971 and 1973.

Jones ranks third in school history in sacks in a season (12) and fifth in career sacks (38). In 1999, he was voted to the 50th Anniversary Senior Bowl All-Time Team. He was inducted into the Black College Football Hall of Fame in 2013.

Professional career

Dallas Cowboys (first stint)
In the 1974 NFL Draft, for the first time in their history, the Dallas Cowboys had the first overall draft choice. The No. 1 selection was acquired from the Houston Oilers in exchange for Tody Smith and Billy Parks. The Cowboys ended up drafting Jones, making him the first football player from a historically black college to go that high in the NFL draft.

He became a starter at left defensive end during his second season in 1975 and by 1977 he had helped the Cowboys win Super Bowl XII. After playing five years for the Cowboys from 1974 through 1978, Jones at 28 years old and in the prime of his athletic career, left football to attempt a professional boxing career.

Boxing career

A former Golden Gloves fighter in Tennessee, Jones would fight six professional bouts as a heavyweight, with a perfect 6–0 record and five knockouts.  Due to his high profile as a football player, all of Jones' fights were televised nationally by CBS.

His pro boxing debut, held in Las Cruces, New Mexico, on November 3, 1979, was controversial. Despite giving away over fifty pounds, opponent Abraham Yaqui Meneses dropped Jones with a left hook in the sixth and final round, then hit him again (illegally) when Jones was down. Jones' cornerman then entered the ring (also illegally) and attempted to revive his fighter with an ammonia bottle. Referee Buddy Basilico reasoned that since both fighters had broken the rules, he would punish neither of them, and let the fight go on. Jones survived the round and was awarded a narrow majority decision, causing the pro-Meneses crowd to boo loudly.

The Meneses bout was the only one of Jones' fights he would not win by knockout. But his other five opponents were journeymen at best, with the arguable exception of Mexican heavyweight champ Fernando Montes, whom Jones knocked out in just 44 seconds on November 24, 1979. After his last ring appearance on January 26, 1980, Jones announced he would return to play for the Dallas Cowboys. In a 2016 interview, Jones called boxing his favorite sport and said that fighting "was probably the best decision [he] ever made," because his boxing training regimen made him a better football player.

Dallas Cowboys (second stint)

He returned to play for the 1980 season, replacing John Dutton at defensive end and performing better than his first stint with the team.

Jones earned All-Pro and Pro Bowl honors three times from 1981 to 1983. He retired at the end of the 1989 season, having never missed a game, playing the most games by any Cowboys player (232) and being tied with Mark Tuinei and Bill Bates for most seasons (15). (Jason Witten has since broken his record for games played while L.P. Ladouceur has broken his record for most seasons played).

Jones was one of the most dominant defensive players of his era, playing in 16 playoff games and three Super Bowls. He was part of three NFC championship teams and the Super Bowl XII champion. His success batting down passes convinced the NFL to keep track of it as an official stat.

The NFL did not start recognizing quarterback sacks as an official stat until 1982; although the Cowboys have their own records, dating back before the 1982 season. According to the Cowboys' stats, Jones is unofficially credited with a total of 106 quarterback sacks (third most in team history) and officially with 57.5. He is the fifth leading tackler in franchise history with 1,032.

In 1985, he achieved a career high of 13 sacks.

Personal life
Jones was a guest referee at the World Wrestling Federation's WrestleMania 2 pay-per-view in 1986.  He refereed from outside of the ring during the 20-man battle royale which included American football stars of the day.
Too Tall Jones also appeared on season 3 episode 1(The Magician) of Diff'ent Strokes, playing himself. 

Jones appeared in a 1992 Married With Children episode, entitled "Just Shoe It", as one of the famous athletes in the sports shoes commercial Al is "starring" in.

Jones starred in a GEICO commercial that initially aired in late 2009. The commercial rhetorically asks if Jones is indeed "too tall," then confirms it by showing a nurse attempting to measure his height, but breaking the medical scale's height rod when it doesn't reach high enough. The nurse then mutters, "I'm just going to guesstimate."

References

External links
 
 

1951 births
Living people
American football defensive ends
Dallas Cowboys players
Tennessee State Tigers football players
Tennessee State Tigers basketball players
National Football League first-overall draft picks
National Conference Pro Bowl players
People from Jackson, Tennessee
Players of American football from Tennessee
Basketball players from Tennessee
Boxers from Tennessee
American male boxers
American men's basketball players
Ed Block Courage Award recipients